Muhsine Gezer (born 1 April 2003) is a Turkish  female para-athlete competing in the T20 disability class of mainly middle-distance events 800 m and 1500 m.

Private life
Muhsine Gezer was born in Burhaniye district of Balıkesir on 1 April 2003.

Sports career
Gezer competed in the triple jump, 800 m, 100 m hurdles and  relay events at the 2016 INAS European Athletics Championships held in Ankara, Turkey, and took the bronze medal in triple jump and the gold medal in 800 m.

She won the bronze medal in the 800 m T20 event at the 2017 World Para Athletics Championships held in London, United Kingdom. The same year, she captured the gold medal in the 400 m event at the World Para Athletics Junior Championships in Nottwil, Switzerland.

Gezer took the silver medal in the 800 m  event, and captured the gold medal in 1500 m event at the 2018 INAS Indoor Athletics Championships in Val-de-Reuil, France.

In 2019, she won a gold medal in the II1 category of the  relay II1 event and three silver medals in the 800 m, 1500 m and 4 x 400 relay events at the INAS Open European Athletics Championships in Istanbul, Turkey. She became world champion in the 1500 m  T20 (U18) event at the 2019 World Para Athletics Junior Championships in Nottwil, Switzerland.

Achievements

DQ: Disqualified
PB: Personal Best

References

2003 births
Living people
Sportspeople from Balıkesir
Female competitors in athletics with disabilities
People from Burhaniye
Turkish female middle-distance runners
Paralympic athletes of Turkey
21st-century Turkish sportswomen